The Love Burglar is a 1919 American silent drama film directed by James Cruze, written by Walter Woods based upon a play by Jack Lait, and starring Wallace Reid, Anna Q. Nilsson, Raymond Hatton, Wallace Beery, Wilton Taylor, and Edmund Burns. The film was released on July 13, 1919, by Paramount Pictures.

The film is now lost.

Plot
As described in a film magazine, Joan Gray (Nilsson), a novelist who is living in the underworld to absorb its atmosphere for her next work, finds herself seriously menaced by Coast-to-Coast Taylor (Beery), a prominent figure of the district who determines to win her by force if necessary. As the situation reaches a climax she is rescued by the famous criminal who has just been released from prison. She continues to sing at the low cafe and accepts the admiring protection of the crook. The latter, unknown to her, is David Strong (Reid), a member of the upper world whose love of adventure and her accounts for his assumption of a famous crook's identity. Matters come to a crisis when his associates urge him to rob a wealthy house, which incidentally is his own home. Joan seeks to prevent it and the real crook arrives in time to also take a hand. David manages to extradite Joan and himself from the situation, and after introductions they plight their troth.

Cast
Wallace Reid as David Strong
Anna Q. Nilsson as Joan Gray
Raymond Hatton as Parson Smith
Wallace Beery as Coast-to-Coast Taylor
Wilton Taylor as Bull Miller
Edmund Burns as Arthur Strong
Alice Terry as Elsie Strong 
Richard Wayne as Rosswell 
Henry Woodward as Dave Dorgan
Loyola O'Connor as Mrs. Eleanor Strong

See also
Wallace Reid filmography

References

External links 

 
 
 Lobby card at silentfilmstillarchive.com

1919 films
1910s English-language films
Silent American drama films
1919 drama films
Paramount Pictures films
Films directed by James Cruze
American black-and-white films
Lost American films
American silent feature films
1919 lost films
Lost drama films
1910s American films